Choron Ka Chor (Thief of Thieves) is a 1970 Indian drama film directed and produced by Mohammed Hussein. The film stars Madan Puri and Dara Singh.

Plot

Ashok plays a masked bandit often referred to Choran Ka Chor who attempts to mess with an international cartel of smugglers while also looking out for a poverty-stricken family who are about to be thrown out onto the street because they cannot pay the rent for their meager apartment.

Cast
 Dara Singh as Ashok
 Shabnam as Rupa
 Madan Puri as Madanlal
 Jayshree T.
 Agha as Makhan
 Bhagwan as Lakhan
 Shetty as Kalu
 Roopesh Kumar  
 Randhir  
 Neelam
 Vishwas Kunte  
 Dada Curtay

Soundtrack
All songs were composed by N. Datta and written by Farooq Kaiser.

References

External links
 

1970 films
1970s Hindi-language films
1970 drama films
Films scored by Datta Naik